The 2022 Concordia Eagles men's volleyball team represented Concordia University Irvine in the 2022 NCAA Division I & II men's volleyball season. The Eagles, led by first year head coach Riley Salmon, played their home games at CU Arena. The Eagles were members of the MPSF and were picked to finish seventh in the MPSF preseason poll. The Eagles tied with BYU for the worst in the league, but due to BYU winning the tiebreaker Concordia finished seventh and fell to USC in the MPSF Tournament 1st Round.

Roster

Schedule
TV/Internet Streaming information:
All home games will be streamed on EagleEye streaming page, powered by Stretch Internet. Most road games will also be streamed by the schools streaming service. The conference tournament will be streamed by FloVolleyball.

 *-Indicates conference match.
 Times listed are Pacific Time Zone.

Announcers for televised games

Saint Xavier: Jeff Runyan & Patience O'Neal
Saint Katherine: Jeff Runyan & Patience O'Neal
The Master's: Jeff Runyan & Valerie Pedersen
Saint Katherine: No commentary
UC San Diego: Bryan Fenley & Ricci Luyties
UC Irvine: Rob Espero & Charlie Brande
UC San Diego: Bryan Fenley & Ricci Luyties
UCLA: Denny Cline
UCLA: Patience O'Neal
Vanguard: No commentary
Stanford: Patience O'Neal
Stanford: Patience O'Neal
UC Irvine: Patience O'Neal
UC San Diego: Patience O'Neal
BYU: Jarom Jordan, Steve Vail & Kiki Solano
BYU: Jarom Jordan, Steve Vail, & Kiki Solano
Ottawa: Patience O'Neal
Long Beach State: Matt Brown & Matt Prosser
Grand Canyon: Ben Rose & Ron J. Ruhman
Grand Canyon: Patience O'Neal
Pepperdine: Patience O'Neal
Pepperdine: Al Epstein
USC: Mark Beltran & Paul Duchesne
USC: Kienan Dixon
UC Santa Barbara: Patience O'Neal
MPSF Quarterfinal- USC: Nick Kopp

References

2022 in sports in California
2022 NCAA Division I & II men's volleyball season
Concordia Irvine